A horizon of predictability is the point after which a dynamical system becomes unpredictable given initial conditions. This includes
Cauchy horizon
Lyapunov exponent
Lyapunov time

See also
Butterfly effect

Dynamical systems